The  (French) or  (Dutch), meaning "Hill/Mount of the Arts", is an urban complex and historic site in central Brussels, Belgium, including the Royal Library of Belgium (KBR), the National Archives of Belgium, the Square – Brussels Meeting Centre, and a public garden.

This site is located between the / and the Place Royale/Koningsplein in its "upper" part, and the / and the / in its "lower" part. It is served by Brussels Central Station.

History

Early history
The area of the Mont des Arts knew different affectations during its history. Later, it used to be a densely populated neighbourhood; the Saint-Roch Quarter, centred around the now-disappeared / and the former / (today's /), where Brussels' first courthouse was located. 

Between the 15th and the 18th centuries, the hill overlooking the neighbourhood was known as the / ("Hill/Mount of the Court") after the former Palace of Coudenberg also located there. This impressive palace, famous all over Europe, had greatly expanded since it had first become the seat of the Dukes of Brabant, but it was destroyed by fire in 1731. Only a small section of the Rue Montagne de la Cour now remains below the Place Royale/Koningsplein. The district's development over the next centuries raised one of the most complex questions in the town-planning history of Brussels: the link between the upper and the lower town through the reorganisation of the Montagne de la Cour.

First Mont des Arts (1910–1954)
By the end of the 19th century, King Leopold II had the idea to convert the site into an arts' quarter and bought the whole neighbourhood. Various architects and urban planners were called upon to draw plans of the buildings which were to accommodate all kinds of cultural institutions. In the meantime, the City of Brussels' then-mayor, Charles Buls, had laid out a modest plan for the Saint-Roch district. His urbanistic and aesthetic conceptions were totally opposed to those of Leopold II. The burgomaster wanted to preserve as much as possible of the old district, whilst the king imagined grandiose projects for his capital. Very isolated, Buls was not followed by the municipal council which voted for the king's project on 19 November 1894. Sickened, Buls resigned five years later.

After the demolition of the old buildings in 1897–98, the site turned into an urban void because the project lacked sufficient finance. An agreement was finally signed in 1903 between the City of Brussels and the Belgian State for the construction of the Central Station and the creation of the Mont des Arts, at the same time as the complete reorganisation of the old Saint-Roch and Putterie/Putterij districts. To increase the area's appeal during the Brussels International Exposition of 1910, the king ordered the French landscape architect Pierre Vacherot to design a "temporary" garden on the hill. It featured a park and a monumental staircase with cascading fountains and terraces descending the gentle slope from the Place Royale down to the /. In 1910, a year after the death of Leopold II, the new park was inaugurated by his successor, King Albert I.

Second Mont des Arts (1954–present)
Although the garden was conceived as temporary, it became a well-appreciated green area in the heart of the capital, but when the plans for the Mont des Arts came back by the end of the 1930s, it had to be demolished to create a new square as the centre of the urban renewal project. The project was entrusted jointly to the architects Maurice Houyoux and Jules Ghobert. Between 1956 and 1969, the park and its surroundings gave way to massive, severe geometric structures such as the Royal Library of Belgium (KBR) and the Congress Palace (now the Square – Brussels Meeting Centre). The new geometric garden, designed by the landscape architect , was built upon the concrete slab covering the Albertine car park. The construction of the Royal Library led to the complete disappearance of the old Palace of Orange-Nassau, with the exception of Saint George's Chapel. Faced with a wave of protests, it was decided in 1961–62 to integrate it into the library complex. The inauguration took place in 1969.

Present day
The Mont des Arts offers one of Brussels' finest views. Though the glass and steel cube forming the new entrance to the convention centre has modified the upper part of the complex, the perspective created by Péchère has largely been preserved. From the elevated vantage point, the famous tower of Brussels' Town Hall on the Grand-Place/Grote Markt is clearly visible. On a sunny day, the Koekelberg Basilica and even the Atomium can be seen. To the west rises the bronze Equestrian Statue of Albert I by the sculptor Alfred Courtens, inaugurated in 1951. From the other end, looking up towards the Place Royale/Koningsplein, the dome of the Church of St. James on Coudenberg closes the perspective.

Major tourist attractions are located within walking distance of the Mont des Arts: the Musical Instruments Museum (MIM), the Royal Museums of Fine Arts, the Royal Palace, and the Cathedral of St. Michael and St. Gudula.

See also
 List of parks and gardens in Brussels
 North–South Junction
 History of Brussels
 Belgium in "the long nineteenth century"

References

Notes

Bibliography

External links

 The Mont des Arts at the Brussels Tourist Board website

Neighbourhoods of Brussels
Parks in Brussels
Squares in Brussels
City of Brussels
Culture in Brussels
Arts in Belgium
Art gallery districts
World's fair sites in Belgium
World's fairs in Brussels
1910 in Belgium